The 1903–04 Irish Cup was the 24th edition of the premier knock-out cup competition in Irish football. 

Linfield won the tournament for the 8th time, defeating Derry Celtic 5–0 in the final.

Results

First round

|}

Replay

|}

Quarter-finals

|}

Semi-finals

|}

Final

References

External links
 Northern Ireland Cup Finals. Rec.Sport.Soccer Statistics Foundation (RSSSF)

Irish Cup seasons
1903–04 domestic association football cups
1903–04 in Irish association football